Paul King (born 1978) is a British writer and director. He works in television, film and theatre, and specialises in comedy. His work on the family comedy films Paddington (2014) and its 2017 sequel both earned him BAFTA nominations for Best British Film and Best Adapted Screenplay.

Career
King graduated from St Catharine's College, Cambridge with first-class honours in English in 1999. While at Cambridge he met Richard Ayoade, Matthew Holness and Alice Lowe, and went on to direct them at the Edinburgh Festival in "Garth Marenghi's FrightKnight" (nominated for the Perrier Award in 2000), and "Netherhead" (Perrier Award winner 2001). King worked as associate director on the subsequent TV transfer, Garth Marenghi's Darkplace, a six-part series for Channel 4. In 2002, King garnered another Perrier Award nomination for directing Noel Fielding's Edinburgh Festival show, "Voodoo Hedgehog".

King is also the director of BBC's The Mighty Boosh. He has directed all three series (earning a BAFTA nomination as Best New Director in 2005), as well as their live tour shows in 2006 and 2008. King was originally brought in after the director of the pilot, Steve Bendelack, was unavailable to direct the first series. He also directed Matt Lucas and David Walliams' 2011 airport mockumentary Come Fly With Me.

Bunny and the Bull, which King wrote and directed, was released in 2009. The film stars Simon Farnaby and Edward Hogg, with cameos from Noel Fielding, Richard Ayoade and Julian Barratt.

King's follow-up feature was the book-to-screen adaptation Paddington (2014), which he directed and co-wrote with Hamish McColl. The film was a critical and commercial success, earning King nominations for both the BAFTA Award for Best Adapted Screenplay and the BAFTA Award for Best British Film (shared with the film's producer David Heyman).

The positive reception for Paddington resulted in the green-lighting of a sequel. King returned to direct and write Paddington 2 (2017). The film received a theatrical release on 10 November 2017 in the U.K. and 12 January 2018 in the U.S. King's upcoming projects include a film about the origins of Willy Wonka.

Filmography

Film

Television

References

External links
 

British theatre directors
Living people
Alumni of St Catharine's College, Cambridge
British film directors
British television directors
1978 births